The R712 road is a short regional road in Ireland, located in County Kilkenny.

The official description of the R712 from the Roads Act 1993 (Classification of Regional Roads) Order 2012  reads:

R712: Kilkenny — Paulstown, County Kilkenny (Part old N10)

Between its junction with N77 at Baun in the county of Kilkenny and its junction with R448 at Paulstown in the county of Kilkenny via Castlecomer Road and Dublin Road in the borough of Kilkenny: Aughmalogue Bridge, Coolgrange and Garryduff Cross in the county of Kilkenny.

References

Regional roads in the Republic of Ireland
Roads in County Kilkenny